Gray Gables, also known as the James S. Mitchell House, is a historic home located at Winton, Hertford County, North Carolina. It was designed by architect Samuel Sloan and built in 1899. It is a three-story, irregularly massed, Queen Anne style frame dwelling. It has a corner tower, a wraparound porch with turned posts and carved brackets, and a steeply pitched gable roof.

It was listed on the National Register of Historic Places in 1982.

References

Houses on the National Register of Historic Places in North Carolina
Queen Anne architecture in North Carolina
Houses completed in 1899
Houses in Hertford County, North Carolina
National Register of Historic Places in Hertford County, North Carolina
1899 establishments in North Carolina